Nadine Prévost (née Fricault; born 7 May 1951) is a French hurdler. She competed in the women's 100 metres hurdles at the 1976 Summer Olympics.

References

External links
 

1951 births
Living people
Athletes (track and field) at the 1976 Summer Olympics
French female hurdlers
Olympic athletes of France
Sportspeople from Marne (department)
Mediterranean Games gold medalists for France
Mediterranean Games medalists in athletics
Athletes (track and field) at the 1975 Mediterranean Games
20th-century French women